Hyperothrix orophura is a species of millipede in the family Pyrgodesmidae. The species is endemic to Mahe Island and Silhouette Island of Seychelles.

References

Animals described in 1900
Endemic fauna of Seychelles
Millipedes of Africa
Polydesmida